Jumana (Yumana, Xomana, Ximana) is an extinct, poorly attested, and unclassified Arawakan language. Kaufman (1994) placed it in his Río Negro branch, but this is not followed in Aikhenvald (1999).

References

Indigenous languages of the South American Northern Foothills
Arawakan languages